The 1955–56 Western Kentucky State Hilltoppers men's basketball team represented Western Kentucky State College (now known as Western Kentucky University) during the 1955-56 NCAA University Division Basketball season. The Hilltoppers were led by future Naismith Memorial Basketball Hall of Fame coach Edgar Diddle and leading scorer Forest Able. Western finished in a three-way tie for the Ohio Valley Conference championship. There was no conference tournament, so a playoff was held to determine which team would advance to the NCAA tournament, which was won by Morehead Sate.

Schedule

|-
!colspan=6| Ohio Valley Conference Playoff

|-

References

Western Kentucky Hilltoppers basketball seasons
Western Kentucky State
Western Kentucky State Basketball, Men's
Western Kentucky State Basketball, Men's